The 1937–38 season was Chelsea Football Club's twenty-ninth competitive season. Chelsea began the season brightly, and topped the table after a 2–1 win over Brentford in October 1937, but won only two of their next 21 league matches and ultimately finished 10th.

Table

References

External links
 1937–38 season at stamford-bridge.com

1937–38
English football clubs 1937–38 season